Poa cita, commonly known as the silver tussock, or wī, which is also the Māori name, is a grass of the family Poaceae that is native to New Zealand. Poa cita was described and named by Elizabeth Edgar in 1986, having previously being named Poa caespitosa. 

It is endemic to New Zealand and found throughout most of the country, from the Kermadec Islands to Stewart Island / Rakiura and out to the Chatham Islands, but not known from Raglan to Manawatū in the west of the North Island, except on Mount Taranaki. 

It grows to 0.3–1.0 metres tall, and sometimes hangs as much as 2 metres long down steep banks. It has very fine, narrow leaves, usually 1–1.5 millimetres and up to 2.5 millimetres wide. Leaf width varies through the country, with narrow, needle-like leaves in the central North Island and relatively wide leaves in the northern North Island.

References

cita
Endemic flora of New Zealand